The women's 4 × 100 metres relay event at the 2016 African Championships in Athletics was held on 24 June in Kings Park Stadium.

Results

References

http://www.athleticskenya.or.ke/wp-content/uploads/2014/04/20th-CAA-Africa-Senior-Championshiops-Durban-Results-2016.pdf

2016 African Championships in Athletics
Relays at the African Championships in Athletics
2016 in women's athletics